Dnestrovsk is a town in southern Moldova, near the border with Ukraine. It is at the shores of the Cuciurgan Reservoir and is home to the Cuciurgan power station, also known as Moldavskaya GRES.

It is a company town which was founded in early Soviet times by the establishment of a large power plant, Moldavskaya GRES, today owned by Inter RAO UES.

At the 1989 census, Dnestrovsk has a population of 14,876. At the 2004 census it had ca. 11,200 inhabitants.

References

Cities and towns in Transnistria
Cities and towns in Moldova
Slobozia District